The canton of La Couronne is an administrative division of the Charente department, southwestern France. Its borders were modified at the French canton reorganisation which came into effect in March 2015. Its seat is in La Couronne.

It consists of the following communes:
La Couronne
Nersac
Puymoyen
Saint-Michel

References

Cantons of Charente